Moanin' the Blues is the second album by American country musician Hank Williams, released on MGM Records in 1952.

Recording and composition
Like Williams' debut LP Hank Williams Sings, Moanin' the Blues contained no new music at the time of its release.  Unlike his debut, which was composed mostly of B-sides that had fared poorly upon release, his second album is packed with hits, including three #1 smashes: "Lovesick Blues," "Long Gone Lonesome Blues," and "Honky Tonk Blues."  "Moanin' the Blues" and "I'm a Long Gone Daddy" were also Top 10 hits, peaking at #2 and #6 respectively.  Although it did not chart when it was released, "I'm So Lonesome I Could Cry," which many believe to be Williams' songwriting masterpiece, is also featured on the LP.  The tracks were recorded between 1947 and 1951, with the most recent cut being "Honky Tonk Blues."  With the exception of "Lovesick Blues," Williams composed all the songs.  The recordings were produced by Fred Rose, who also compiled the album around a blues theme.  Curiously, Williams' most blues-influenced cuts, "My Bucket's Got a Hole in It" and the nascent rock and roller "Move It on Over," are omitted.  It was unlikely that the album was a major priority for MGM; it was axiomatic that country LPs didn't sell, and the notion of a single as a trailer for the hugely more profitable album was still more than ten years away.

Track listing
All songs written by Hank Williams unless otherwise indicated:
"Lovesick Blues" (Cliff Friend, Irving Mills)
"Moanin' the Blues"
"The Blues Come Around"
"I'm So Lonesome I Could Cry"
"I'm a Long Gone Daddy"
"My Sweet Love Ain't Around"
"Long Gone Lonesome Blues"
"Honky Tonk Blues"

Personnel
Hank Williams - guitar, vocal
Tommy Jackson - fiddle
Jerry Rivers - fiddle
Robert "Chubby" Wise - fiddle
Farris Coursey - drums (on "Moanin' the Blues")
Don Helms - steel guitar
Jerry Byrd - steel guitar
Bob McNett - electric guitar
Zeke Turner - electric guitar
Sam Pruett - electric guitar
Jack Shook - rhythm guitar
Louis Innis - rhythm guitar, bass guitar
Howard Watts - bass guitar
Willie Thawl - bass guitar
Fred Rose - piano (unconfirmed)
Owen Bradley - piano (unconfirmed)

References

Hank Williams albums
1952 albums
MGM Records albums